SS Navemar  was a cargo steamship that was built in England in 1921, was Norwegian-owned until 1927 and then Spanish-owned for the rest of her career. An Italian submarine sank her in the Strait of Gibraltar in 1942.

Navemar is notable for a voyage in 1941 in which she carried about 1,120 European Jewish refugees to the United States in overcrowded and unsanitary conditions.

Building
Armstrong, Whitworth & Co of Newcastle upon Tyne, United Kingdom built the ship as Frogner for Fearnley and Eger of Oslo, Norway, completing her in October 1921.

Her boilers supplied steam at 180 lbf/in2 to a three-cylinder triple expansion steam engine of 548 NHP that drove a single screw.

Career 1921–41
In 1927 Ybarra y Compania of Seville bought the ship and renamed her Cabo Mayor. In 1932 Compañía Española de Navegación Marítima bought her and renamed her Navemar.

On 22 December 1932 Navemar collided with the French steamship Bernardin de St. Pierre at Marseille, Bouches-du-Rhône, France, and was beached. She later was repaired and returned to service.

In 1937–38 Navemar was the subject of a court case in the United States between the Government of the Republic of Spain and the ship's crew, who were trying to prevent her from being requisitioned in the Spanish Civil War. The Supreme Court of the United States ruled in favour of the Spanish Government.

Refugee voyage
In 1941, the American Jewish Joint Distribution Committee (known as "The Joint") were desperate to rescue Jewish refugees from Germany, Austria and Czechoslovakia escaping Nazi persecution. Many held US visas that were about to expire. The Joint's agents directed them to Seville, where the Navemar had been privately chartered to make the transatlantic crossing. Tickets for the few passenger cabins sold at exorbitant prices. The captain vacated his cabin and charged $2,000 to all who could fit themselves into the small space. Bunks were fitted in the filthy cargo holds, which had previously carried coal. Although attempts were made to clean the ship, there was too little time to complete the task.

Navemar left Seville on 7 August 1941. She called at Lisbon in Portugal, where many of the visas were extended by the US Embassy. After calling at Havana in Cuba she reached New York on 12 September 1941. Many of the passengers had contracted typhus and six of them died in the seven-week crossing.

Subsequent career and fate
After her refugee voyage Navemar returned to general trade. On 23 January 1942 the   torpedoed and sank her in the Strait of Gibraltar.

References

Sources

External links
 archival holdings of deposit cards of passengers on Navemar
 Collection contains lawyer Saul Sperling's notes and correspondence on the suit brought by passengers against the owners of Navemar after she reached New York in September 1941.

 

1921 ships
Cargo ships
Ships sunk by Italian submarines
Jewish-American history
Jewish immigrant ships
Maritime incidents in 1932
Maritime incidents in January 1942
Ships built by Armstrong Whitworth
Ships built on the River Tyne